Fairtex is a Thailand muay thai, boxing, mixed martial arts and clothing brand that was founded by Bunjong Busarakamwongse (better known as Mr. Philip Wong) in Bangkok, Thailand in 1958. Fairtex won the Best MMA gloves Award at World MMA Awards in 2008. Fairtex is gloves partner of ONE Championship events since 2010 to present.

Fairtex is now headed by Mr. Philip Wong's son, Prem Busarabavonwongs at the brand's headquarters located in Pattaya, also the location of the Fairtex Training Center.

See also

Fairtex Gym
List of fitness wear brands
List of companies of Thailand

References

TrueStore's Wikibrands

External links
 
 Instagram

Sportswear brands
Sporting goods manufacturers of Thailand
Clothing companies of Thailand
Clothing companies established in 1958
1958 establishments in Thailand